Baicheng County as the official romanized name, also transliterated from Uyghur as Bay County (pronounced like 'bye',), is a county in Aksu Prefecture of the Xinjiang Uyghur Autonomous Region, People's Republic of China.

History
In 1882, the county was established.

On 6 November 1997, a member of a Xinjiang separatist group, Muhammat Tursun, fatally shot imam Yunus Sidiq Damolla at his mosque in Baicheng County.

According to a report from Radio Free Asia, on February 17, 2015, seventeen Uyghurs (four policemen, nine attackers and four bystanders) were killed after a stabbing incident  from a police station in the county.

On September 18, 2015,  a group of terrorists, suspected to be Uyghurs, attacked workers and security guards at the Sogan Colliery in Terek, leaving at up to 50 dead and 50 wounded. A manhunt for the suspects concluded on November 13, with 28 suspects killed and 1 surrendering. In interview with Radio Free Asia, county police officers confirmed that women and children were among those killed in November.

On December 5, 2019 at around 10:46 a.m., a 4.9 magnitude earthquake struck the county.

Geography
The county is located in the northern part of the prefecture, occupying the valley of the Muzart River between the southern slopes of the Tengritagh and the Qoltagh.

Climate

Administrative divisions
Towns:
 Bai Town ( / , Baicheng Zhen)
 Tirek Town ( / , Tiereke Zhen)
 Qarqi Town (Yaqeriq;  / , Cha'erqi Zhen)
 Sairam Town (Sayram;  / , Sailimu Zhen) – birthplace of the historian Musa Sayrami

Townships:
 Qeyir Township ( / , Heiyingshan Xiang)
 Kizil Township ( / , Kezi'er Xiang) – site of a number of Buddhist grotto sites, including Kizil Caves
 Toqsun Township ( / , Tuokexun Xiang)
 Yatur Township ( / , Yatu'er Xiang)
 Kanchi / Kanqi Township ( / , Kangqi Xiang)
 Bulung Township ( / , Bulong Xiang)
 Miqigh Township ( / , Mijike Xiang)
 Onbash Township ( / , Wenbashi Xiang)
 Chong Kowruk Township ( / , Daqiao Xiang)
 Qarabagh Township ( / , Laohutai Xiang)

Economy 
The county’s economy is based on agriculture and produces rapeseed in abundance. Animal husbandry is also common. Mineral resources are rich. Industries include coal, iron, electronics, fertilizer, tractors, vegetable oil extraction, etc. The Tianshan Mountains have lush spruce forests.

, there was about 67,500 acres (445,577 mu) of cultivated land in Bay.

Demographics

As of 2015, 212,272 of the 241,079 residents of the county were Uyghur, 26,559 were Han Chinese and 2,248 were from other ethnic groups.

As of 1999, 87.03% of the population of the county were Uyghur and 12.08% of the population was Han Chinese.

Transportation
 China National Highway 217

Historical maps 
Historical English-language maps including the county:

Notes

References

External links
 County Government 

 
County-level divisions of Xinjiang
Aksu Prefecture